Samoëns is a commune in the Haute-Savoie department in the Auvergne-Rhône-Alpes region in south-eastern France. It is the principal commune for the canton which bears its name. The town of Samoëns is located in the Vallée du Giffre (Giffre Valley) in the French Alps.

Stonemasons
Stone has long been a traditional feature of the Upper Giffre Valley which is dotted with limestone quarries (hardness coefficient, 13). To supplement their income from farming, the men in the region used to work stone.

In 1659, there were so many frahans (the local name for stonecutters and masons) in Samoëns and their expertise was so well known that they set up a very famous brotherhood. It engaged in charity work, taking care of the sick and training young apprentices in its own school of draughtsmen, which had an extensive library.

The members of the brotherhood of masons and stonecutters in Samoëns were contacted for leading construction projects. They worked with Vauban on his fortifications, were commissioned by Napoleon Bonaparte to build canals in Saint-Quentin, and worked in Givors and even further afield, in Poland, Louisiana and Australia.

To ensure that they were not understood by outsiders when talking to each other, they used their own dialect, called mourmé.

Evidence of their work can be seen all over the village, in its architecture.
Even now, there are a number of stonecutters upholding the tradition in Samoëns and the brotherhood has become a cultural association, the Société des Maçons.

Tourist destination
The town carries the designation of a "ville fleurie" distinguishing it as one of the most beautiful towns in France.

Approximately a 70 km drive from Geneva Airport, Samoens is a summer destination as well as the site of a ski resort that departs from a lift (Grand massif Express) at the edge of town linking up to Samoëns 1600. Also known as the Plateau des Saix, this resort is part of the larger five-town Grand Massif which includes Flaine and Morillon.

Samoëns has been awarded the 'Famille Plus Montagne' label. Samoëns is the only winter sports resort to be classified by the Caisse Nationale des Monuments Historiques.

As well as skiing, Samoens offers a range of non-skiing activities including dog-sledding, indoor climbing, caving and diving under ice.

Jaysinia and the Cognac-Jaÿ Foundation
Jaÿsinia (3.7 hectares) is a botanical garden specializing in alpine flowers, established in 1906 by Marie-Louise Cognacq-Jaÿ, a native of Samoëns and founder of La Samaritaine department store in Paris. Since 1936 it has been directed by the Scientific Division of Botany from the National Museum of Natural History. It is open all year and is free of charge.

Chapels
There are nine chapels in and around Samoëns, in addition to many shrines and other cultural buildings. Most were built in the 17th century, except for the chapel in Le Bérouze – dating from the 15th century – and the one in Les Allamands, dating from the 19th century.

Two of these buildings were moved from the sites where they were originally constructed. The chapel in Le Bérouze was originally built at the mountain pass known as "Col de Couz", but it was badly damaged during an invasion by Swiss troops in 1476. Four years later, it was decided to rebuild it on the main square. In Mathonex, the chapel now overlooks the village, but the original building was much closer to the village centre; its relocation became a necessity after a landslide.

See also
 Reseau Jean Bernard
 Grand Massif
 Morillon, neighbouring commune
 Communes of the Haute-Savoie department

References

For Premier Accommodation in Samoens please visit www.alpsaccommodation.com

External links

Premier Chalets and Apartments in Samoens - Alps Accommodation
More on Samoens

Communes of Haute-Savoie
Ski areas and resorts in France